Stade d'Honneur is a multi-use stadium in Meknes, Morocco.  It is currently used mostly for football matches and hosts the home games of CODM Meknès. The stadium holds 25,000 people.

References

Football venues in Morocco
Buildings and structures in Meknes
COD Meknès